Ivan Nevistić (born 31 July 1998) is a Croatian professional footballer who plays as a goalkeeper for GNK Dinamo Zagreb, in the Croatian Football League.

Club career
Nevistić joined Rijeka's youth team in June 2015. He signed his first professional contract with the club in June 2016. He spent most of his early professional years on loan at Varaždin. In July 2018, Nevistić signed a new 4-year contract with Rijeka. In 2020–21 Europa League, Nevistić accumulated more saves than any other goalkeeper in the group stage (19), as Rijeka finished last in their group.

International career 
He has been capped for various Croatian youth national teams.

References

External links
 

1998 births
Living people
People from Đakovo
Association football goalkeepers
Croatian footballers
Croatia youth international footballers
Croatia under-21 international footballers
HNK Rijeka players
NK Varaždin players
NŠ Mura players
GNK Dinamo Zagreb players
NK Lokomotiva Zagreb players
First Football League (Croatia) players
Croatian Football League players
Croatian expatriate footballers
Expatriate footballers in Slovenia
Croatian expatriate sportspeople in Slovenia